Happy Days is a 1978 Turkish comedy film directed by Orhan Aksoy.

Plot
It tells the story of a husband and wife divorced because of a ridiculous issue. Husband and wife, who produce and sell pickles, are constantly fighting. One day, they get divorced after arguing over whether to make pickle juice better with vinegar or lemon juice. Three of the children stay with their mother and the other three with their father. They do not see each other for years. One day, everything changes when the truth of two brothers who fight without knowing each other by chance. All siblings try to reconcile their parents. The environment gets mixed up with the lies of Ziya, the pickle maker man's brother.

Cast 
 Münir Özkul - Kazim
 Adile Naşit - Saadet
 Şener Şen - Ziya
 Ayşen Gruda - Nilgun
 Oya Aydoğan - Zeynep
 Ahmet Sezerel - Ugur

Bibliography
 Neşeli Günler, Beyazperde - "Özet", Access date: 15 May 2022

References

External links 

1978 comedy films
1978 films
Turkish comedy films
1970s Turkish-language films